A PAG (Projets d'AvantGarde Ltda) was a small Brazilian automobile company founded by Paulo de Aguiar Goulart, owner of a famous Volkswagen concessionaire in São Paulo. The company built cars between 1988 and 1991. Its biggest hit was a car named Nick, a sport compact hatchback based on the first generation Volkswagen Gol GTi.

Models 

 PAG Nick
 PAG Nick L
 PAG 928
 PAG Chubby

References 

Car manufacturers of Brazil
Cars of Brazil
Vehicle manufacturing companies established in 1988
1988 establishments in Brazil